The 1921–22 Football League season was Birmingham Football Club's 26th in the Football League and their 9th in the First Division, having been promoted as Second Division champions in 1920–21. They retained their First Division status, finishing in 18th position in the 22-team division.

They did not take part in the 1921–22 FA Cup. Secretary-manager Frank Richards failed to submit their entry form in time to be granted exemption from qualifying, and the Football Association refused to bend the rules in their favour. Although that decision did not preclude their entering the competition in the qualifying rounds, the directors chose not to do so.

Thirty-one players made at least one appearance in nationally organised first-team competition, and there were twelve different goalscorers. Goalkeeper Dan Tremelling played in 39 matches over the 42-match season; among outfield players, half-back Alec McClure appeared in 35. Joe Bradford and Johnny Crosbie were joint leading scorers with 10 goals.

Football League First Division

League table (part)

Appearances and goals

Players with name struck through and marked  left the club during the playing season.

See also
Birmingham City F.C. seasons

References
General
 Matthews, Tony (1995). Birmingham City: A Complete Record. Breedon Books (Derby). .
 Matthews, Tony (2010). Birmingham City: The Complete Record. DB Publishing (Derby). .
 Source for match dates and results: "Birmingham City 1921–1922: Results". Statto Organisation. Retrieved 18 May 2012.
 Source for lineups, appearances, goalscorers and attendances: Matthews (2010), Complete Record, pp. 284–85.
 Source for kit: "Birmingham City". Historical Kits. Dave Moor. Retrieved 12 May 2021.

Specific

Birmingham City F.C. seasons
Birmingham